Llyan Oliver Fernandez Austria is a Filipino architect and YouTube content creator. He is best known for his Pinoy Architect reaction videos which gained prominence during the 2020 coronavirus pandemic in the Philippines.

Education
Austria graduated with an architecture course from Saint Louis University in Baguio. In 2016, Austria was ranked fifth in the Architect Licensure Examination (ALE) with an average score of 81.50%.

YouTube career
In 2017, he started creating YouTube tutorials and architecture-related content under the name Llyan Austria, mostly spoken in English.

During the 2020 coronavirus pandemic in the Philippines, his Pinoy Architect reaction videos, which is mostly spoken in Filipino, uploaded in his second channel Oliver Austria gained increasing popularity after reacting to house tours of Lloyd Cadena, Mimiyuuuh, Slater Young, Team Kramer (Doug and Cheska Kramer and family), and Ivana Alawi. Due to his reaction videos, his channel suddenly reached one million subscribers on YouTube last August 16, 2020.

Awards and nominations

References

Living people
21st-century Filipino architects
Filipino YouTubers
Video bloggers
Male bloggers
People from Baguio
Saint Louis University (Philippines) alumni
Year of birth missing (living people)